The 2019 Nigerian House of Representatives elections in Kwara State was held on February 23, 2019, to elect members of the House of Representatives to represent Kwara State, Nigeria.

Overview

Summary

Results

Asa/Ilorin West 
A total of 10 candidates registered with the Independent National Electoral Commission to contest in the election. APC candidate Alajagusi Abdulyekeen Sadiq won the election, defeating Abdulrazaq Mohammed Lawal of PDP and  other party candidates.

Baruten/Kaiama 
A total of 11 candidates registered with the Independent National Electoral Commission to contest in the election. APC candidate Muhammed Omar Bio won the election, defeating  of Abubakar Musa PDP and other party candidates.

Edu/Moro/Patigi  

A total of 14 candidates registered with the Independent National Electoral Commission to contest in the election. APC candidate Ahmed Abubakar Ndakenne won the election, defeating Hassan Mahmud Babako of PDP and  other party candidates.

Ekiti/Isin/Irepodun/Oke-ero 
A total of 16 candidates registered with the Independent National Electoral Commission to contest in the election. APC candidate Olawuyi Abdulraheem Olatunji won the election, defeating Dare Bankole of PDP and  other party candidates.

Ilorin East/South 
A total of 14 candidates registered with the Independent National Electoral Commission to contest in the election. APC candidate Olododo Abdulganiyu Saka Cook won the election, defeating Abdulwahab Oladimeji Issa of PDP and  other party candidates.

Offa/Oyun/Ifelodun 
A total of 14 candidates registered with the Independent National Electoral Commission to contest in the election. APC candidate Tijani Kayode Ismail won the election, defeating Olarinoye Tope Olayonu of PDP and  other party candidates.

References 

Kwara State House of Representatives elections
House of Representatives
Kwara